William III de Beauchamp (c. 1215 – 1269) of Elmley Castle in Worcestershire, was an English Baron and hereditary Sheriff of Worcestershire.

Origins
He was the son and heir of Walter II de Beauchamp (1192/3-1236) of Elmley Castle, hereditary Sheriff of Worcestershire, by his wife Johanna Mortimer (d.1225), daughter of Roger Mortimer (d. 1214) of Wigmore Castle in Herefordshire.

Career
On the death of his father in 1236 he became hereditary Sheriff of Worcestershire, which title he held until his death. In 1249 he  was excommunicated by Walter de Cantilupe, Bishop of Worcester, but was later absolved, in the presence of the king, on St. Edmund's Day, 1251.

Marriage and children
He married Isabel de Mauduit, daughter of William de Mauduit of Hanslope in Buckinghamshire and Hartley Mauditt, Hampshire (by his wife Alice de Beaumont (d. pre- 1263), half-sister of Henry de Beaumont, 5th Earl of Warwick (c.1192-1229)) and sister and heiress of William Mauduit, 8th Earl of Warwick. By Isabel he had issue including:
William de Beauchamp, 9th Earl of Warwick (c.1238-1298), eldest son and heir;
Walter de Beauchamp (d.1303/6), of Powick and of Beauchamp's Court, Alcester in Warwickshire, Steward of the Household to King Edward I. His descendant was John Beauchamp, 1st Baron Beauchamp (d. 1475) "of Powick" in Worcestershire.
 Alicia de Beauchamp, married Bernard I de Bruce of Connington, had issue.

References

Untitled English Nobility- Beauchamp

1269 deaths
High Sheriffs of Worcestershire
William
13th-century English people
Year of birth uncertain